Patricio in Spanish, or Patrício in Portuguese, is a male given name equivalent to Patrick in English. 

The Spanish name is pronounced with the stress on the same first i as Portuguese, but an accent is not needed because this follows normal rules for stress in Spanish.

Notable people with the name include:

Given name 
Spanish
 Patricio Arabolaza, (1893–1935), Spanish footballer
Patricio Aylwin (1918–2016), Chilean politician
 Patricio Montojo, (1839–1917), Spanish admiral
Patricio O'Ward (born 1999), Mexican race car driver
Portuguese
 Patrício Antônio Boques (born 1974), Brazilian footballer
Patrício Freire (born 1987), Brazilian mixed martial artist known as Patrício Pitbull

Surname
 Miguel Patricio (born 1966/1967), Portuguese businessman
 Rui Patrício (born 1988), Portuguese footballer

Spanish masculine given names
Portuguese masculine given names